The Clerk of the Deliveries of the Ordnance was a subordinate of the Master-General of the Ordnance and a member of the Board of Ordnance from its constitution in 1597. He was responsible for keeping record of the number and kind of stores issued from the stocks of ordnance. The office was abolished in 1830.

Clerks of the Deliveries of the Ordnance (pre-Restoration)
28 November 1570: Brian Hogg (d. bef. 1595)
18 August 1578: George Hogg (joint)
8 May 1595: John Linewray (joint)
20 July 1602: Sir Robert Johnson
12 December 1604: Robert Johnson junior (d. bef. 1606) (joint)
6 May 1618: Edward Johnson and Henry Johnson (joint)
17 July 1640 Thomas Eastbrooke and George Clark (joint)

Clerks of the Deliveries of the Ordnance (Parliamentary)
March 1643: Stephen Darnelly
December 1644: Thomas Heselrig
September 1646: William Billers

Clerks of the Deliveries of the Ordnance (post-Restoration)
1660 George Clark (restored)
15 April 1670: George Wharton
25 November 1670: Samuel Fortrey
2 February 1682: William Bridges
1 August 1683: Thomas Gardiner
2 April 1685: Sir William Trumbull
2 December 1685: Philip Musgrave
27 July 1689: Christopher Musgrave
15 May 1696: James Lowther
15 February 1701: John Pulteney
18 June 1703: James Craggs
1 March 1711: Newdigate Ousley
30 June 1713: Richard King
2 December 1714: James Craggs
24 March 1715: Thomas Frankland
16 March 1722: Leonard Smelt
31 May 1733: William Rawlinson Earle
1 May 1741: Andrew Wilkinson
23 April 1746: Charles Frederick
26 March 1751: John Staunton Charlton
8 July 1758: Sir Charles Cocks, Bt
8 December 1772: Benjamin Langlois
20 June 1778: Henry Strachey
16 October 1780: John Kenrick
1 March 1784: Thomas Baillie
17 May 1802: Joseph Hunt
10 January 1804: Cropley Ashley
12 March 1806: James Martin Lloyd
7 April 1807: Cropley Ashley
29 July 1807: Thomas Thoroton
31 October 1812: Edmund Phipps

References
http://www.history.ac.uk/office/ordnance.html

Military history of the United Kingdom
Deliveries of the Ordnance
1597 establishments in England
Senior appointments of the British Army
War Office